Anjathe is a 2008 Indian Tamil-language neo-noir action thriller film written and directed by Mysskin and produced by V. Hitesh Jhabak. The film stars Narain, Prasanna, Ajmal Ameer, and Vijayalakshmi. The film opened to rave reviews for its technical expertise, avant-garde filmmaking, and for the performance of actor Prasanna. The film became a "super-hit" at the box office. The composition of frames, selection of shots and its counter meaning in narration made Anjathe a perfect example of Tamil New Wave cinema. The film was remade in Kannada as Anjadiru (2009).

Plot
Sathyavan and Kripakaran are close friends living opposite each other in the police quarters neighborhood. Sathya is a rowdy, wasting his time drinking merrily and getting involved in fights. Though he and Kripa pass college with a first-class degree, Sathya has no interest in joining the police force. Kripa studies hard to become a Sub-Inspector and challenges Sathya to do the same. Just a day before the exam, Sathya decides to take up the exam as well, much to his friend's surprise. Owing to his uncle's political connections, he passes the physical, written, and interview and becomes an SI. However, Kripa does not make it through despite being straightforward; this creates a rift between the two. Kripa's father lies to Sathya that he has gone to Mumbai, but Sathya finds him in the local bar, having become a drunkard.

The parallel is the story of Deena Dayalan and Loganathan, who extort money from businessmen through kidnappings. Before Sathya becomes a policeman, he beats up Daya for attempting to molest Kripa's sister Uthra, though none, including Kripa, knows of this.

Sathya gains fame by holding off knife-wielding men who come to kill an injured man at a hospital, though the man is killed later in the night. As a result, Sathya is drafted into a special task force to catch the gang members related to the crime. Meanwhile, Daya and Logu carry out two kidnappings, rape the victims on both occasions, and release them for ransom money. Kripa is beaten up by the police for a skirmish at the local bar; his father suffers a heart attack after getting his son back from the police station. At this point of time, Kripa is employed by Daya, mainly because the former is distraught and will fall easily to the lure of money and booze. In the third time, however, the police are informed, but the kidnappers find out by chance and change the drop off point at the last moment. They give the police the slip but narrowly avoid capture, with Kripa providing shelter for them in his house. Kripa joins along to get money for his father's angioplasty, though he does not realize until it is too late that he is doing illegal things and harming young children.

Meanwhile, Sathya identifies Daya from the characteristics, with a background check revealing that Daya was accused of raping his senior's wife in the army. Daya, Logu, and their accomplices are again almost caught when the police trace one of the accomplice's families. Daya kills his own man during this raid to avoid information being passed, and hatches a plan to escape to Bihar in a poultry van. Logu is killed by Daya upon learning that the former had hatched a plan to kill him. However, to escape to the city outskirts to rendezvous with the van, they hijack the Inspector-General's car with his two daughters inside. Switching soon to a disguised-dog van to get past check-posts with the two girls, Daya, Kripa, and another accomplice arrive at a sugarcane field. Sathya recognizes Kripa's voice from the ransom call he makes to the IG, and follows Uthra from the hospital, who has been instructed to bring a bag full of cash from their home (kept there by Daya), to the sugarcane field.

The plot to kidnap the IG's daughters is an elaborate ruse to divert the police force to the south of the city while they escape from the north. The special task force, who are in the south of the city, realize the plot and, upon learning that Sathya is alone in the north of the city, head in that direction. In the sugarcane fields, Kripa shows compassion towards the two girls, treating them softly. Upon hearing some noise in the field, Daya splits the group, doing so to meet up directly with Uthra, who has the money. He tries to rape her, but Sathya intervenes. A fist fight ensures, but the special task force comes upon them and kills Daya by setting it up as an encounter.

The two girls split and escape from the third accomplice, only for one of them to be recaptured by him, but is let off being too tiring to carry. Kripa and the third accomplice try to run away, with Uthra behind him. Just as he leaves her to escape, she reveals that she is in love with Sathya and uses the situation to handcuff herself to Kripa to avoid him from escaping. In the end, Sathya shoots Kripa in self-defense and to save one of the IG's daughters from being shot. When Kripa lies on Sathya's lap shot, Kripa finds a ring he once gifted to Sathya on his birthday, which Kripa believed was thrown away by Sathya when he was drunk while partying at the bar, which in turn wets Kripa's eye and dies. The ending scenes of the film show Sathya and Uthra getting married and having a son, whom they name Kripa.

Cast

 Narain as SI Sathyavan (Sathya)
 Prasanna as Deena Dayalan (Daya)
 Ajmal Ameer as Kirubakaran (Kiruba)
 Vijayalakshmi as Udhra, Kiruba's sister
 Pandiarajan as Loganathan (Logu)
 Livingston as Masilamani, Udhra & Kiruba's Father
 Ponvannan as Assistant Commissioner Keerti Vaasan (Dubbed by Mysskin)
 Bomb Ramesh as Kuruvi (Satya & Kiruba's friend)
 Sridhar as Sappai, Deena Dayalan's right hand
 M. S. Bhaskar as Loganathan, Sathya's father
 Priyasri as Sathya's mother
 Jasper as an anti-kidnapping team member (Police Officer)
 Manobala as Murugesan
 Naren Narayanan as a kidnapped girl's father
 Snigdha Akolkar as the yellow-sari-clad dancer

Production
After Mysskin had completed and released his maiden venture Chithiram Pesuthadi in 2006, he wrote the script for Nandalala for eight months, which was supposed to be his next directorial. A. M. Ratnam was initially to produce the film, for which his son Ravi Krishna was to play the lead role. Despite completing a photo shoot with Ravi Krishna, the film was shelved, since Ratnam opted out, after he incurred heavy losses with his previous productions. Mysskin decided to postpone the project, since "nobody was interested", and instead wrote a new story and commenced a new project, Anjathe with 4.5 crore budget, which itself was a result of Mysskin's anger. Nandhalala was initially Sneghidha's debut Tamil film, for which Mysskin had signed her in 2006 already, but with the film getting postponed, she made her first appearance in Anjathe that Mysskin decided to direct instead.

Soundtrack
The music was composed by Sundar C. Babu in his second collaboration with director Mysskin after Chithiram Pesuthadi.
The first lines of Kaththazha Kannaala are based on the Nusrat Fateh Ali Khan rendition of the song Sanson Ki Mala Pe.

Box office
 The film was a commercial success grossing 1.68 crore at the Chennai box office.

Awards

References

External links
 

2008 films
2000s action drama films
2008 action thriller films
Films directed by Mysskin
Tamil films remade in other languages
2000s Tamil-language films
Indian vigilante films
Films about kidnapping in India
Films about rape in India
Fictional portrayals of the Tamil Nadu Police
Indian neo-noir films
Indian action drama films
Indian action thriller films
Films about child abuse
Films scored by Sundar C. Babu
2000s police procedural films
Films about child abduction in India
2008 drama films